Center Township is one of twelve townships in Porter County, Indiana, United States. As of the 2010 census, its population was 43,267.

History
Center Township was organized in 1836, and named for its location at the geographic center of Porter County.

Cities and towns
The largest community in the township is Valparaiso.

Education
Center Township is served by the Valparaiso Community Schools.  Their high school is Valparaiso High School.

Valparaiso is also the home of Valparaiso University.

References

External links

Townships in Porter County, Indiana
Townships in Indiana